Oulaya Amamra (born 12 November 1995) is a French actress known for starring in the 2016 films Divines and Tamara. She won the César Award for Most Promising Actress in 2017 for Divines.

Amamra is the younger sister of director Houda Benyamina. Amamra attended Catholic school and studied classical dance for 15 years.

Benyamina cast Amamra for a lead role in Divines, although initially concerned that the project could threaten their relationship. In January 2017, Amamra won the Lumières Award for Most Promising Actress for the role. She won Most Promising Actress at the 2017 César Awards on 24 February.

Filmography

References

External links
Oulaya Amamra at the Internet Movie Database

1996 births
21st-century French actresses
French film actresses
French people of Moroccan descent
French television actresses
Living people
Most Promising Actress César Award winners
Most Promising Actress Lumières Award winners